Cristian Marchi (born March 31, 1976 in Mantova, Italy) is an Italian progressive house, electro house and house music producer and DJ.

Musical career
His professional career began in 1999, when he was employed as a DJ and a speaker for Radio Base, a local radio station of his hometown, Mantova. Prior to that, he worked as an electrician during the day and a DJ at night. His appeal as a DJ and performer grew over the years. He now does around 100 DJ gigs a year, all around the world, including Europe, Australia, Egypt, and Korea. He is usually a DJ guest in Paradise Mykonos, Greece, Tito's Palma de Mallorca, Spain, and Bussola Versilia or Aquafan Riccione, Italy.

In February 2013, his music podcast House Victim reached #1 on iTunes Italy in two charts: Top Episodes Music and Top Podcasts Music. His compilation album, We Are Perfect under Universal Music Italy, reached #1 on iTunes Dance Albums chart in Italy.

Cristian Marchi's tracks and remixes are supported and playlisted by top DJ's such as David Guetta, Bob Sinclar, Dada Life and are released by many labels all around the world, including Time Records, Ultra Records, Universal Music Italy, Ego Music and his own label, Violence Rec. He describes his own music as "modern house" and he is considered a key figure of the European house scene. He is also the DJ testimonial for Pioneer CDJ, one of the main technology tools for DJ's. His most popular track is Love, Sex, American Express, a 2008 song realized with Dr. Feelx's very important contribute.

Discography

Albums
 2004: Sun Connection - "Love me Like a Flower"
 2007: "Cristian Marchi E.P. Part 1"  (12")
 2007: Cristian Marchi Presents Love Project (2) - "Love"  (12")
 2007: Cristian Marchi presents Saudage Project feat. Sharon May Linn - "Love Is Gonna Get You"  (12")
 2008: Cristian Marchi Feat. Dot/Comma - "We Are Perfect"  (12") 
 2008: Cristian Marchi Presents Marchi's Flow Feat. Vincent* - "Star In The Sky"
 2008: Cristian Marchi feat. Dr Feelx - "Love, Sex, American Express" 
 2008: Marchi's Flow* vs Love (11) Feat. Miss Tia - "Feel The Love"  (CD, Single)
 2009: Cristian Marchi Feat. Dot/Comma - "Disco Strobe"  
 2009: Nari & Milani And Cristian Marchi With Max 'C - "Let It Rain" 
 2010: Nari & Milani And Cristian Marchi Feat. Luciana* - "I Got My Eye On You" 
 2010: Cristian Marchi And Nari & Milani Feat. Max'C - "I Got You" 
 2011: We Are Perfect (Universal Music)
 2011: Gabry Ponte, Sergio D'angelo & Cristan Marchi Feat. Andrea Love - "Don't Let Me Be Misunderstood"
 2011: Cristian Marchi & Gianluca Motta - "Love Comes Rising"
 2011: Cristian Marchi And Syke 'n' Sugarstarr Feat. Lisa Millett - "U Got Me Rockin'"  
 2011: Nari & Milani, Cristian Marchi Ft Shena - "Take Me To The Stars"
 2012: Nari & Milani And Cristian Marchi Feat. Shena - "Love Will Conquer All"  
 2013: DJ Antoine, Cristian Marchi & Mad Mark - "Now or Never"
 2013: Cristian Marchi feat. Max 'C - "Let's F**k"
 2013: Fedo Mora & Cristian Marchi - "Hey Dj!"
 2013: Cristian Marchi, Execute, feat. Christine P LG - In love with a stranger
 2013: Marchi's Flow - "Made To Love You"
 2014: Cristian Marchi-One Night
 2015: Cristian Marchi feat. Luciana - Keep Calm And Twerk On
 2015: Cristian Marchi feat. Max' C - Second Chance

Remixes
2010: Deep Swing - "In The Music" (Cristian Marchi Perfect Remix) 
2012: Maurizio Gubellini & Delayers - "In Da House" (Cristian Marchi Remix)
2012; Nari & Milani and Maurizio Gubellini - "Up" (Cristian Marchi Remix)
2013: Ben Dj ft. Chris Willis - "Survivor" (Cristian Marchi Remix)

References

1976 births
Living people
Italian record producers
Italian house musicians
Italian DJs
Progressive house musicians